The 1930 Tulane Green Wave football team represented Tulane University during the 1930 Southern Conference football season. The team, which was led by fourth-year head coach Bernie Bierman,  posted an 8–1 record and shared the Southern Conference (SoCon) title with national champion Alabama. Tulane outscored its opponents 263–30, eliminating six of nine competing teams.

Times-Picayune sports writer Pete Baird called the 1930 squad "the best team that ever represented the Olive and Blue". The team's only losing game was to Big Ten co-champion Northwestern. Tulane defeated Georgia Tech at Grant Field for the first time. One writer called the Tulane victory over the Georgia Bulldogs "one of the finest games ever played by any Green Wave team in Tulane football history".

The team included end Jerry Dalrymple in the College Football Hall of Fame and halfback Don Zimmerman in the Louisiana Sports Hall of Fame. The team's quarterback was future head coach Red Dawson.

Pre-season

After the end of the previous season, at the annual alumni banquet, center Loyd Roberts was elected captain of the defending SoCon champion Tulane football team.

Head coach Bernie Bierman used a single-wing offense.  He faced a challenge with an all-new backfield and the graduation of all-time great Bill Banker. This year's backfield would include quarterback Red Dawson, triple-threat halfbacks Wop Glover and Don Zimmerman, and fullback Nollie Felts.

Dawson was a northerner from River Falls, Wisconsin, where line coach Ted Cox had previously coached at River Falls State. Felts had played for Southern Miss and is considered one of the best football players in that school's history. He was already married with a son and studying medicine at Tulane.

On the line, the team consisted of veterans such as ends Dalrymple and Jack Holland, center Roberts and guard Maury Bodenger, and the only newcomer John Scafide. Both Glover and Scafide prepared at Saint Stanislaus College by playing for the "Rock-a-chaws".

Schedule

Season summary

Southwestern Louisiana

Sources:

15,000 Tulane fans attended the opening day of the 1930 season, September 27. The new running backs played well and Tulane defeated Southwestern Louisiana 84–0. Elmer Massey scored three touchdowns, and Francis Payne and Don Zimmerman each scored two. Coach Bierman sent in reserves in the second and fourth quarters.

The starting lineup was DeColigny (left end), McCance (left tackle), Bodenger (left guard), Roberts (center), McCormick (right guard), Upton (right tackle), Haynes (right end), Dawson (quarterback), Zimmerman (left halfback), Massey (right halfback), and Felts (fullback).

Northwestern

Sources:

Tulane was defeated by Big Ten co-champion Northwestern, 14–0, its only loss this season, breaking a school-record 10-game winning steak. After a scoreless first quarter,  Tulane quarterback Red Dawson's pass was intercepted by Northwestern's Hank Bruder, who returned  for a touchdown. Northwestern's quarterback Pug Rentner, a member of the College Football Hall of Fame, scored the next touchdown.

John Scafide's talent was discovered in the game against Northwestern; when he was sent into the game to carry a message to the team, he "started taking two men out on every play".

The starting lineup was Holland (left end), McCance (left tackle), Bodenger (left guard), Roberts (center), McCormick (right guard), Upton (right tackle), Haynes (right end), Dawson (quarterback), Massey (left halfback), Whatley (right halfback), and Felts (fullback).

Texas A&M

Sources:

At Fair Park Stadium, Dallas, Tulane won 19–9 over Texas A&M. Wop Glover ran for two touchdowns. The Aggies took an early 2–0 lead off a safety from a blocked Felts punt. Glover then ran , sweeping around the left end after a fake pass, behind a devastating block by Dalrymple. Glover's other touchdown was a  run.

The Aggies managed a final score against Tulane's reserves.

The starting lineup was Holland (left end), McCance (left tackle), Bodenger (left guard), Roberts (center), Scafide (right guard), DeColigny (right tackle), Dalrymple (right end), Dawson (quarterback), Massey (left halfback), Glover (right halfback) and Felts (fullback).

Birmingham–Southern
In a difficult game, Tulane defeated Birmingham–Southern 21–0. Wop Glover scored the first touchdown. The third touchdown came when Tulane got a touchdown on a quarterback sneak by Will Pat Richardson on the goal line on fourth down.

The starting lineup was Holland (left end), McCance (left tackle), Bodenger (left guard), Roberts (center), Scafide (right guard), DeColigny (right tackle), Dalrymple (right end), Dawson (quarterback), Glover (left halfback), Massey (right halfback) and Felts (fullback).

Georgia Tech

Sources:

On October 25 at Grant Field, Atlanta, Tulane won its first victory over Georgia Tech 28–0. Several attractions were held in Atlanta due to an influx of people from New Orleans; with Moina Michael, who conceived the idea of using poppies as a symbol of remembrance for those who served in World War I, as guest of honor.

Tulane had eleven first downs and Tech had three. Zimmerman scored the first touchdown on a  run. He set up a second touchdown by Felts. A long pass to Holland netted a pass interference penalty and soon after, Glover ran a short distance around end for the third touchdown.

In the fourth quarter, Dalrymple and Holland stopped Tech quarterback Earl Dunlap for a safety. For the final score, Felts caught a pass on the  line and ran the rest of the way for a touchdown.

The starting lineup was Holland (left end), McCance (left tackle), Bodenger (left guard), Roberts (center), Scafide (right guard), Upton (right tackle), Dalrymple (right end), Dawson (quarterback), Whatley (left halfback), Glover (right halfback) and Felts (fullback).

Mississippi A&M

Sources:

Tulane won against coach Red Cagle's Mississippi A&M team by 53–0. The first touchdown came when Zimmerman ran a punt back . "Early in the second period, Tulane executed a triple pass, Felts to Dawson to Zimmerman, and Zimmerman made his third touchdown by running  around end".

A blocked punt and an interception by Lodrigues helped pour on the scoring in the fourth quarter. The final score of the game came soon after Percy went off right tackle, cut back and went  down to the  line. Lemmon plunged behind left guard for the score.

The starting lineup was Holland (left end), McCance (left tackle), Mangum (left guard), Roberts (center), Scafide (right guard), Upton (right tackle), Dalrymple (right end), Dawson (quarterback), Glover (left halfback), Zimmerman (right halfback) and Felts (fullback).

Auburn

Sources:

Tulane Green Wave defeated the Auburn Tigers 21–0. Despite the score, it was considered a close game.  The first quarter was scoreless. Nollie Felts scored a touchdown in the second quarter. Times-Picayune writer Bill Keefe wrote Felts played "as fine a game as any back ever played".

The highlight of the next scoring drive was a  run by Zimmerman. A  run by Zimmerman in the third quarter was called back due to a holding penalty. At another point, Zimmerman fumbled the ball at Auburn's  line; this was recovered by Jimmy Hitchcock for a touchback. Felts scored the game's last touchdown.

According to one account, "Two of Tulane's scores came as the results of breaks, one in the second period as Hitchcock got off a poor punt, and another in the final as Hatfield fumbled, both miscues occurring deep in Auburn territory".

The starting lineup was Holland (left end), Upton (left tackle), Bodenger (left guard), Roberts (center), McCormick (right guard), DeColigny (right tackle), Dalrymple (right end), Dawson (quarterback), Glover (left halfback), Zimmerman (right halfback) and Felts (fullback).

Georgia

Sources:

Tulane defeated the Georgia Bulldogs 25–0 on a muddy field, sealing the conference championship in "one of the finest games ever played by any Green Wave team in Tulane football history".

In the last half-minute of the first quarter, Zimmerman ran  for a touchdown. He went back to pass but nobody was open and the pass rush was on so Zimmerman effectively ran a draw play for a touchdown. He was injured in the play. The second touchdown came on a  run from Glover, running through right tackle, crossing field and breaking the tackle of Georgia safety and quarterback Austin Downes.

The starting lineup was Holland (left end), McCance (left tackle), Bodenger (left guard), Roberts (center), Scafide (right guard), Upton (right tackle), Dalrymple (right end), Dawson (quarterback), Zimmerman (left halfback), Glover (right halfback) and Felts (fullback).

LSU

Sources:

On Thanksgiving Day, Tulane closed the 1930 season with a 12–7 win over the rival LSU Tigers. LSU blocked a punt and scored a touchdown, and kept Dalrymple well covered. Governor Huey P. Long cheered on the Tigers.

The starting lineup was Holland (left end), McCance (left tackle), Bodenger (left guard), Roberts (center), Scafide (right guard), Upton (right tackle), Dalrymple (right end), Dawson (quarterback), Glover (left halfback), Zimmerman (right halfback) and Felts (fullback).

Post-season
Times-Picayune sports writer Pete Baird called the 1930 squad "the best team that ever represented the Olive and Blue". Both Alabama and Tulane claimed SoCon titles. Tulane, which had been undefeated by a SoCon school for two years, challenged Alabama to a postseason contest but Alabama declined.

Wop Glover, as the school's best all-around athlete, received the Porter Cup. Collier's Weekly chose Dalrymple for the first-team All-American, and  International News Service chose Roberts as a third-team All-American. Zimmerman and Bodenger received votes for All-Southern, both appearing on Associated Press second team. Maury Bodenger went on to play for the National Football League's Portsmouth Spartans, which later became the Detroit Lions.

Jack Holland took up professional boxing to earn money to finish his Tulane degree and with the ultimate intent of coaching high school football. He also worked as an artist's model to pay for his education. He won the Southern A. A. U. light-heavyweight boxing title in 1932. On May 9, 1933, Holland died from a cerebral hemorrhage after losing in six rounds to Tony Marullo. As Holland climbed through the ropes to go to the dressing room, ringsiders heard him say; "I [head]butted him" before he collapsed.

Jerry Dalrymple was elected to the College Football Hall of Fame as a player in 1954, the second class of inductees.  Don Zimmerman was inducted into the Louisiana Sports Hall of Fame in 1975. Red Dawson was elected to the Tulane Athletic Hall of Fame in 1980, as were Wop Glover in 1984, John Scafide in 1985, and Loyd Roberts and Nollie Felts in 1990.

Players

Depth chart
The following chart provides a visual depiction of Tulane's lineup during the 1930 season with games started at the position reflected in parenthesis. The chart mimics a single wing on offense.

Line

Backfield

Unlisted

Notes

References

Tulane
Tulane Green Wave football seasons
Southern Conference football champion seasons
Tulane Green Wave football